The Cuban Pacification Medal (Navy) is a military award of the United States Navy which was created by orders of the United States Navy Department on 13 August 1909. The medal was awarded to officers and enlisted men who served ashore in Cuba between the dates of 12 September 1906 and 1 April 1909, or who were attached to a specific number of ships, for the Cuban Pacification.

Eligible ships
The crews of the following ships were awarded the Cuban Pacification Medal (Navy) for service during the noted periods of time:

References

United States service medals